The Black Dahlia is a nickname given to 1940s murder victim Elizabeth Short.

Black Dahlia or The Black Dahlia may also refer to:

Works based on the murder 
 Who Is the Black Dahlia? (1975 TV movie)
 The Black Dahlia (novel), by James Ellroy
 The Black Dahlia (film), by Brian De Palma, based upon Ellroy's novel
 The Black Dahlia (graphic novel), by Alexis Nolent and David Fincher, also based on Ellroy's novel
 Black Dahlia (film), by Ulli Lommel
 Black Dahlia (video game), a 1998 computer adventure game

Music 
 The Black Dahlia Murder (band), a melodic death metal band
 "Black Dahlia" (song), a 2008 song by Hollywood Undead
 "Black Dahlia", a song by Anthrax from We've Come for You All
 The Black Dahlia, a 2001 jazz orchestral composition by Bob Belden
 "Black Dahlia", a song by Porcupine Tree from The Incident
 "Black Dahlia", a song by Angel Haze from Dirty Gold

See also
 Black Dalia, a 2009 Indian film 
 Blag Dahlia (born 1966), punk rock musician and lead singer of The Dwarves
 Dahlia (disambiguation)
 Sofia Black-D'Elia (born 1991), American actress